The following is a list of episodes for the SD Gundam Sangokuden Brave Battle Warriors anime series, based on the SD Gundam model kit series BB Senshi Sangokuden.

There are two ending themes used. The first, is performed by Ko-saku, and is used from episode 1 to episode 26. The second, is performed by Ryuubi (Yuuki Kaji), Kan-u (Hiroki Yasumoto), Chouhi (Masayuki Katou), Sousou (Kenji Nomura) and Sonken (Nobunaga Shimazaki), and is used from episode 27 onwards.

The anime has 4 distinct arcs:
 
The first, the Toutaku arc, lasts from episode 1 to episode 13, detailing the rise of various heroes to defeat Toutaku's tyranny.

The second, the Enjyutsu arc, lasts from episode 14 to episode 26, detailing the rise of warlords all over Mirisha, expanding their influence, and the rise of Enjyutsu after he unwittingly comes across the Gyokuji, which disappeared after the Toutaku arc.

The third, the Enshou arc, lasts from episode 27 to episode 39, detailing Enshou's rise to power after obtaining the Gyokuji from Enjyutsu.

The fourth arc, the Sousou arc, lasts from episode 40 to episode 51, detailing Sousou's ambition to unify the whole of Mirisha under his rule, that finally leads up to the climactic battle of Red Cliffs.

Each episode is about 15 minutes long.



Episode list

SD Gundam Sangokuden Brave Battle Warriors

Movie list

Chō Denei-ban SD Gundam Sangokuden Brave Battle Warriors
 is a special movie episode that aired after the fifth Sgt. Frog (Keroro Gunsō) film, . The story is set chronologically during episode 4 of the SD Gundam Sangokuden Brave Battle Warriors anime series, after Toutaku has Reitei assassinated, and before Sousou tries to assassinate Toutaku.

References

External links
 
 Official SD Gundam Sangokuden Brave Battle Warriors website
 
 Official Chō Denei-ban SD Gundam Sangokuden Brave Battle Warriors website

SD Gundam Sangokuden Brave Battle Warriors
Sangokuden Brave Battle Warriors